Sigmund Haringer (9 December 1908 – 23 February 1975) was a German footballer

Club career 
He played club football with Bayern Munich, Wacker München and 1. FC Nürnberg. With Bayern he won the German football championship in 1932.

International career 
Haringer participated at the 1934 FIFA World Cup. Overall he won 15 caps for the Germany national team.

References

External links
 
 
 
 

1908 births
1975 deaths
German footballers
Germany international footballers
1934 FIFA World Cup players
FC Bayern Munich footballers
Footballers from Munich
Association football defenders
20th-century German people